Peter Wellington is a Canadian film and television director. His films have included Joe's So Mean to Josephine, for which he won the Claude Jutra Award in 1996, Luck (2003) and Cottage Country (2013).

Wellington has also directed the television series Slings and Arrows and episodes of the series 18 to Life (including its pilot), Traders, Exhibit A: Secrets of Forensic Science, The Eleventh Hour, Rent-a-Goalie, Being Erica, Single White Spenny, Rookie Blue, Saving Hope and Kim's Convenience.
 
His brother David also works in film and television, and has directed eight episodes of the Canadian supernatural medical drama Saving Hope.

References

External links
 

Film directors from Ontario
Canadian television directors
Living people
Best First Feature Genie and Canadian Screen Award winners
20th-century Canadian screenwriters
Canadian Film Centre alumni
Year of birth missing (living people)
20th-century Canadian male writers
21st-century Canadian screenwriters
21st-century Canadian male writers
Canadian male screenwriters